Ouled Cebbah is a small town and rural commune in Berrechid Province of the Casablanca-Settat region of Morocco. In the 2014 Moroccan census the commune recorded a population of 7606 people living in 1524 households. At the time of the 2004 census, the commune had a total population of 7635 people living in 1395 households.

The name of the city comes from an Arab tribe from Oulad Akhdar, themselves derived from Amar, the grandson of Riyah (Hilalians family).

References

Populated places in Berrechid Province
Rural communes of Casablanca-Settat